There have been 14 coaches of the Canberra Raiders since their first season in 1982.

List of coaches

See also

List of current NRL coaches
List of current NRL Women's coaches

References

External links

Coaches
Canberra-related lists
National Rugby League lists
Lists of rugby league coaches